Joe or Joseph Meyers may refer to:
Joe Meyers (American football) (1871–1959), American college football coach
Joseph Meyers (born 1860), American politician and stonecutter
Joe Meyers (tennis), American professional tennis player

See also
Joel Meyers, American sportscaster
Joel Myers, founder of AccuWeather
Joseph Meyer (disambiguation)
Joseph Mayer (disambiguation)